Alexander Shunnarah is a personal injury lawyer from Alabama, and founder, president, and CEO of Alexander Shunnarah Injury Lawyers, which operates in Alabama, Tennessee, Arkansas, Florida, Mississippi, Louisiana, Texas, Wisconsin, Massachusetts, New Hampshire, New York, and Georgia. Shunnarah has built a reputation also for his marketing campaign consisting of television and social media ads and especially billboards, said to be ubiquitous across Alabama.

Biography
Alexander Shunnarah was born in Birmingham, Alabama and attended John Carroll Catholic High School. He attended Samford University but transferred to University of Alabama at Birmingham; he graduated with a BS in political science and sociology in 1991. In 1995 he received his law degree from Birmingham School of Law and after working in Birmingham, he established his own law firm in 2001.

Shunnarah's company started with one legal assistant and marketing that consisted of "handing out business cards to family and friends and fellow church members". By 2014 his firm, headquartered in Birmingham, covered North Alabama and in January 2014 had started Alexander Shunnarah & Associates, which covered the Alabama, Florida, and Mississippi coastal areas. In 2016 he opened a new corporate headquarters in Birmingham, employing 60 attorneys.

Shunnarah is well-known for the ubiquity of his billboards. He refused to disclose how much he spends on advertising, but did make a video poking fun at his "unparalleled billboard empire across the state and the [southeast]" and has spoken on national conferences about his marketing campaigns. In 2016, he was named "Master of Marketing" by The National Trial Lawyer Magazine. At that time, he and his slogan "Let Me Be Your Attorney" were found "on more than 2,000 billboards and thousands of TV commercials and other ads".

References

Living people
Alabama lawyers
University of Alabama at Birmingham people
Year of birth missing (living people)